Hồng Lĩnh may refer to several places in Vietnam, including:

Hồng Lĩnh, a district-level town of Hà Tĩnh Province
Hồng Lĩnh, Thái Bình, a commune of Hưng Hà District